Kuli Khoda Karam (also Romanized as Kūlī Khodā Karam) is a village in Howmeh-ye Sharqi Rural District, in the Central District of Ramhormoz County, Khuzestan Province, Iran. At the 2006 census, its population was 49, in 10 families.

References 

Populated places in Ramhormoz County